The flag of Annandale, Virginia, was adopted on August 16, 2006, by the Annandale Chamber of Commerce, a private organization. It is unofficial as Annandale is a census-designated place and unincorporated area; its area falls under the jurisdiction of Fairfax County.

Description
The flag has a sky blue background, with a three white bars (representing Cannon Park at the intersection of Backlick Road and Columbia Pike) going inward from the outside of the flag, leading to a red oval. Inside the oval is a stylized light blue dogwood tree with a stylized red cardinal sitting on one of the tree's branches.

History
The flag project was initiated by Sami Azzam Kalifa, owner of the Flower Den in Annandale and a former chamber president. In remarks at the first flag-raising at Cannon Park in downtown Annandale, Kalifa noted that, as an expatriate and immigrant, "Annandale is the center of my life. My home and business are here along with my heart and family. We are not a city and we have no mayor. But now we have a flag."

The Annandale Chamber of Commerce asked Peter Ansoff, president of the North American Vexillological Association (NAVA) and resident of Annandale, to suggest improvements to the design. Ansoff created a panel of NAVA members, who suggested many improvements to the original design. In June 2006, the new flag was selected by "a vote of attendees at the chamber’s annual dinner" out of 27 variations; the winning selection was designed by resident Michelle Redmon.

References

External links 
 

Annandale
Flag
Flags of places in the United States
Flags of Virginia
2006 establishments in Virginia
Flags displaying animals
Unofficial flags